The Cross of Saint James, also known as the Santiago cross, cruz espada, or Saint James' Cross, is a heraldic badge that is cruciform in design. The cross, shaped as a cross fitchy, combines with either a cross fleury or a cross moline. Its most common version is a red cross resembling a sword, with the hilt and the arm in the shape of a fleur-de-lis.

It gets its name from James the Greater and the account of his appearance at the Battle of Clavijo in the Spanish victory over the Moors. It is used widely throughout Spain and Portugal.

Background
In heraldry, the cross is also called the Santiago cross or the cruz espada (English: sword cross). It is a charge, or symbol, in the form of a cross. The design combines a cross fitchy or fitchée, one whose lower limb comes to a point, with either a cross fleury, the arms of which end in fleurs-de-lis, or a cross moline, of which the ends of the arms are forked and rounded.

The most common version is a red cross resembling a sword, with the shape of a fleur-de-lis on the hilt and the arms. The three fleurs-de-lis represent the "honor without stain," which is in reference to the character of the Apostles. The sword is said to represent both the courage of James, and the manner of his martyrdom, as he was beheaded with a sword.

The insignia is said to have originated from the mythical Battle of Clavijo, wherein Saint James appeared to Ramiro I of Asturias after the king prayed to the patron saint of Galicia for help leading the army to victory over the Moors.

A comparison of the crosses that make up the Cross of St. James:

Use 

Medieval Pilgrims embarking on the Camino de Santiago would bring a pastry with them on their way to St. James' shrine in Galicia. Since the early part of the 20th century, the cross has been used as a decorative element on the almond pastry Tarta de Santiago. A traditional Galician dessert made from ground almonds, the top of the pie is decorated with powdered sugar, masked by an imprint of the cross which gives the dessert its name.

A red cross on a white field is a common design for a Christian cross. The cross is the symbol of the crucifixion, the white color symbolizing purity, and the red color symbolizes the blood of Christ. A red Cross of Saint James, with flourished arms and scalloped top, over a field of white was the emblem of the 12th-century Spanish Order of Santiago and Portuguese Military Order of Saint James of the Sword. Both were named after James the Greater.

In Spain, the Order of Santiago, a religious and military order founded in the 12th century, was founded to protect the pilgrims on the Camino, and to defend Christendom against the Moors then on the Iberian Peninsula. Knights of the order wore the cross stamped on the their standards and white capes.

On the Camino, the cross is often seen with a Pilgrim's scallop to mark the way of the pilgrimage. It is said that the "fitchy" shape originated in the era of the Crusades, when the knights took with them small crosses with sharpened bottoms to stick them in the ground and carry out their daily devotions.

Gallery
Examples of the cross displayed on the Way of Saint James

Examples of the cross displayed throughout Spain

Examples of the cross in art

Further reading

See also
Saint George's Cross

References

External links

 
 

Christian crosses
Saint James